The Nokia 2110 is a cellular phone made by the Finnish telecommunications firm Nokia, first announced in February 1993. It is the first Nokia phone with the famous Nokia tune ringtone. The phone can send and receive SMS messages; and lists ten dialed calls, ten received calls and ten missed calls. At the time of the phone's release, it was smaller than others of its price and had a bigger display, so it became very popular. It also features a "revolutionary" new user interface featuring with two dynamic softkeys, which would later lead to the development of the Navi-key on its successor, the Nokia 6110, as well as the Series 20 interface.

A later version, the Nokia 2110i, released in 1994, comes with more memory and a protruding antenna knob.

A variant model, the Nokia 2140 (more popularly called the Nokia Orange), is the launch handset on the Orange network (now EE). It differed in that it was designed to work on the 1800 MHz frequency then utilised by Orange, and had a slightly less bulbous design.

A North American model, the Nokia 2190, was also available. It is one of the earlier phones available on the Pacific Bell Mobile Services and Powertel's newly launched GSM 1900 network in 1995. A version for Digital AMPS was produced as the Nokia 2120.

Another variant, the Nokia C6, was introduced in 1997 for Germany's analogue C-Netz.

See also
 HP OmniGo 700LX, a palmtop PC with built-in Nokia 2110

References

External links

  full phone specifications
 
 A Nokia 2110 User Manual

2110
Mobile phones introduced in 1994